Saint Zacchaeus of Jerusalem (died 116 AD?) is a 2nd-century Christian saint venerated by the Roman Catholic and Eastern Orthodox churches. Also known also Zacharias, he was the fourth Bishop of Jerusalem. His feast day is August 23.

According to Eusebius, he was a Jewish Christian. Little is known about his life although he is recognized as a saint. 
His episcopacy was about the years 112 to 116, when he probably died.

References

Year of birth unknown
116 deaths
2nd-century bishops of Jerusalem
2nd-century Christian martyrs
2nd-century Christian saints
Saints from the Holy Land